Tava was a carbonated beverage fortified with vitamins and minerals, released by PepsiCo in the first half of 2008. It was marketed exclusively on the web.

Intended for health-conscious consumers, the beverage's nutrients included vitamins B3, B6 and E, and chromium. Tava contained no calories and no caffeine, and instead of being called a "soft drink" was promoted as a "sparkling beverage." The beverage debuted with three flavors: Tahitian Tamure (Tropical Berry Blend), Mediterranean Fiesta (Black Cherry Citrus), and Brazilian Samba (Passion Fruit Lime). Production ceased in early 2009 because it wasn't popular enough.

External links
Former official Tava website (link redirects to flash-based pepsi.com)

References

Diet drinks
PepsiCo soft drinks
Products introduced in 2008
Food and drink introduced in 2008